Pentarhizidium orientalis, the Oriental ostrich fern, is a fern native to China, Japan, and the Himalayas. It grows to about 0.6 m (2 ft) in height by 0.6 m (2 ft) wide. It was formerly included in the genus Matteuccia, but phylogenetic studies mandated that it and Pentarhizidium intermedium be moved to a new genus.

References

External links

 The Plant List entry
 Plants for a Future entry
 
 Efloras entry
 Robert M. Lloyd, Facultative Apomixis and Polyploidy in Matteuccia orientalis, American Fern Journal, Vol. 63, No. 2 (Apr.–Jun. 1973), pp. 43–48. Published by the American Fern Society.

Polypodiales